Filipino Sign Language (FSL) or Philippine Sign Language, is a sign language originating in the Philippines. Like other sign languages, FSL is a unique language with its own grammar, syntax and morphology; it is neither based on nor resembles Filipino or English. Some researchers consider the indigenous signs of FSL to be at risk of being lost due to the increasing influence of ASL.

The Republic Act 11106 or The Filipino Sign Language Act, effective November 27, 2018, declared FSL as the national sign language of the Filipino Deaf.

ASL influence
FSL is believed to be part of the French Sign Language family. It has been strongly influenced by American Sign Language since the establishment in 1907 of the School for the Deaf and Blind (SDB) (now the Philippine School for the Deaf) by Delia Delight Rice (1883–1964), an American Thomasite teacher born to deaf parents. The school was run and managed by American principals until the 1940s. In the 1960s, contact with American Sign Language continued through the launching of the Deaf Evangelistic Alliance Foundation and the Laguna Christian College for the Deaf. Another source of ASL influence was the assignment of volunteers from the United States Peace Corps, who were stationed at various places in the Philippines from 1974 through 1989, as well as religious organizations that promoted ASL and Manually Coded English. Starting in 1982, the International Deaf Education Association (IDEA), led by former Peace Corps volunteer G. Dennis Drake, established a series of residential elementary programs in Bohol using Philippine Sign Language as the primary language of instruction. The Bohol Deaf Academy also primarily emphasizes Philippine Sign Language.

According to sign language researcher Dr. Lisa Martinez, FSL and ASL deviate across three important metrics: different overall form (especially a differing handshape inventory), different methods of sign formation, and different grammar.

Status
Usage of Filipino Sign Language was reported in 2009 as being used by 54% of sign-language users in the Philippines. In 2011, the Department of Education declared Signing Exact English the language of deaf education in the Philippines. In 2011, Department of Education officials announced in a forum that hearing-impaired children were being taught and would continue to be taught using Signing Exact English (SEE) instead of Filipino Sign Language (FSL). In 2012, House Bill No. 450 was introduced in the Philippine House of Representatives by Rep. Antonio Tinio (Party-list, ACT Teachers) to declare FSL as the National Sign Language of the Philippines and to mandate its use as the medium of official communication in all transactions involving the deaf and the language of instruction of deaf education. , that bill was pending with the Committee on Social Services.

In September 2018, Senate Bill No. 1455, sponsored by Senators Nancy Binay, Sherwin Gatchalian, Chiz Escudero, Bam Aquino, Loren Legarda, Joel Villanueva, Cynthia Villar, and Juan Miguel Zubiri, passed on third and final reading.

On October 30, 2018, Republic Act 11106 or The Filipino Sign Language Act was signed into law by President Rodrigo Duterte  declaring the Filipino Sign Language as the national sign language of the Filipino Deaf. The law also declares the country's national sign language as the official sign language of the government in all transactions involving the deaf.

The law, which seeks to eliminate all forms of discrimination against the Filipino Deaf, also mandates the use of the Filipino Sign Language in schools, broadcast media, and workplaces. It also mandates the Komisyon sa Wikang Filipino, in consultation with the stakeholders, to establish a national system of standards and procedures for the interpretation of the Filipino Sign Language. The University of the Philippines System and other education agencies are tasked to develop guidelines for the development of training materials in the education of the Deaf. The law also require the availability of qualified sign language interpreters in all hearings, proceedings, and government transactions involving the Deaf.

"The FSL shall be recognized, promoted and supported as the medium of official communication in all transactions involving the deaf, and as the language of instruction of deaf education, without prejudice to the use of other forms of communications depending on individual choice or preference," the law states.  The Department of Education (DepEd), Commission on Higher Education (CHEd), Technical Education and Skills Development Authority (Tesda), and all other national and local government agencies involved in the education of the deaf, are tasked to use and coordinate with each other on the use of FSL as the medium of instruction in deaf education.

The law became effective on November 27, 2018 while its implementing rules and regulations was approved in 2021.

See also
Deafness in the Philippines
The Thomasites
International Deaf Children's Society
Deaf International Basketball Federation

References

Bibliography
Video
Mi Ultimo Adios in Filipino Sign Language
Philippine National Anthem in Filipino Sign Language
Silent Odyssey: A Journey into the Deaf World
Filipino Sign Language GMANews TV Documentary

Text
An Introduction to Filipino Sign Language (PDRC/PFD, 2004)
Filipino Sign Language: A Compilation of Signs from Regions of the Philippines (PFD, 2005)
Status Report on the Use of Sign Language in the Philippines (NSLC)
Filipino Sign Language (PEN International, DLS-College of St. Benilde) downloadable PDF
Republic Act 11106 downloadable PDF

French Sign Language family
American Sign Language family